Ankarana Special Reserve is a protected area in northern Madagascar created in 1956. It is a small, partially vegetated plateau composed of 150-million-year-old middle Jurassic limestone. The rugged relief and the dense vegetation have helped protect the region from human intrusion.

Geology
To the south, the limestone mass breaks up into separate spires known as tower karst. In the center of the plateau, seismic activity and eons of rainfall have eroded the limestone, forming deep gorges and ribbons of flowstone. In places where the calcific upper layers have been completely eroded, the harder base rock has been etched into channels and ridges known in malagasy as tsingy. The area is littered with basalt boulders and basalt has also flowed deep into the canyons that dissect the Massif.

Exploration
Beginning in the 1960s, expatriate Frenchman Jean Duflos (who after marriage changed his name to Jean Radofilao) undertook a huge amount of exploration of the cave systems and subterranean rivers of the Massif, much of it on his own or with visiting speleologists. Around  of cave passages within the massif have been mapped.
La Grotte d'Andrafiabe, one of the most accessible caves, comprises at least  of horizontal passages. Indeed, the Massif contains the longest cave systems in Madagascar, and probably in the whole of Africa.

Fauna
Expeditions that first began cataloguing the animals and plants of the Special Reserve created around the Ankarana Massif in the 1980s are described in Dr Jane Wilson-Howarth's travel narrative Lemurs of the Lost World and in the scientific press. Discoveries included unexpected sub-fossil remains of large extinct lemurs and surviving but previously undescribed species of blind fish, shrimps and other invertebrates. Several expedition members contributed photos to an illustrated introductory guide to Madagascar which features the Crocodile Caves of Ankarana.

During the 1986 expedition, Phil Chapman and Jean-Elie Randriamasy collated a bird list for the reserve and recorded 65 species from 32 families representing nearly a third of all bird species that breed in Madagascar. They also noted one interesting aspect of behaviour. They reported that there was an unusual strategy used by many of the small insect-eating songbirds. Species such as the Paradise Flycatcher (Terpsiphone mutata), the Common Jery (Neomixis tenella), the Greenbuls (Phyllastrephus zosterops and Phyllastrephus madagascariensis), the Bulbul (Hypsipetes madagascariensis), the Sunbird (Nectarinia souimanga) and the Vagas (Lepopterus madagascarinus and Xenopirostris polleni) foraged together in mixed bands. Within each band different species seemed to specialise in where and how they searched out their insect prey. Some species concentrated on the trunk and branches of trees, some on slender boughs, others searched beneath the leaves. By acting together in this way they probably increased foraging efficiency as each species could catch others’ escaped prey. They were also safer from attack by predators, as the group as a whole was more likely to spot approaching danger.

The Ankarana Reserve is an important refuge for significant populations of the crowned lemur (Eulemur coronatus), Sanford's brown lemur (Eulemur sanfordi) and other mammal species. The following lemurs are also recorded from the area: northern sportive lemur (Lepilemur septentrionalis), brown mouse lemur (Microcebus rufus), fat-tailed dwarf lemur (Cheirogalus medius), fork-marked lemur (Phaner furcifer), eastern woolly lemur (Avahi laniger), Perrier's sifaka (Propithicus diadema perrieri), aye-aye (Daubentonia madagascariensis) and the western lesser bamboo lemur (Hapalemur griseus occidentalis).

In addition subfossils of the following lemurs have been found at Ankarana: greater bamboo lemur (Prolemur simus), indri (Indri indri), the sloth lemur (Babakotia radofilai), Mesopropithicus dolichobrachion and Palaeopropithicus cf ingens plus Pachylemur sp., the huge Megaladapis cf madagascariensis/grandidieri, and the baboon lemur Archaeolemur sp.

See also
Madagascar dry deciduous forests
Crowned lemur

References

External links
 Madagascar National Parks

Special reserves of Madagascar
Mountains of Madagascar
Geography of Madagascar
Plateaus of Africa
Protected areas in Diana Region
Protected areas established in 1956
Geology of Madagascar
Madagascar subhumid forests
Madagascar dry deciduous forests
Important Bird Areas of Madagascar